Rank comparison chart of officers for navies of Oceanian states.

Officers

See also
Comparative navy officer ranks of the Americas
Ranks and insignia of NATO navies officers

References

Military comparisons